St Margaret and St James' Church is located about   to the south of the village of Long Marton, Cumbria, England.  It is an active Anglican parish church in the deanery of Appleby, the archdeaconry of Carlisle, and the diocese of Carlisle.  The parish is one of ten local parishes  which form the benefice of the Heart of Eden. The church is recorded in the National Heritage List for England as a designated Grade I listed building.

History
Originating before the Norman conquest, the church contains Anglo-Saxon and Norman architectural features.  The tower was added probably in the early 12th century, and the chancel was extended later that century.  A south chapel was added in the 15th century, and the vestry in the following century.  The church was restored by John A. Cory in 1880.

Architecture

The church is constructed in stone with large quoins and slate roofs.  Its plan consists of a nave with a south porch, a south chapel (or transept), a chancel with a north vestry, and a west tower.  Parts of the nave walls are Anglo-Saxon, other parts of the nave and the blocked north doorway are Norman, and the chancel is in Decorated style.  The tower is in three stages, with paired bell openings.  The windows around the church are in varying styles, most of them being mullioned.  Three of the doorways have tympana containing carvings of dragons and other items.  Inside the chancel are a double sedilia and a piscina.  Most of the furnishings are from Cory's restoration.  A window has been inserted into the blocked north doorway; this contains stained glass dated 1930 by Stanley M. Scott, depicting Saints Margaret and James flanked by Saints Cosmas and Damian.  In the south transept is a window of 1925 to the memory of the architect George Dominic Stampa.

See also

Grade I listed churches in Cumbria
Grade I listed buildings in Cumbria
Listed buildings in Long Marton

Notes

References

External links

Photographs from Visit Cumbria

Church of England church buildings in Cumbria
Grade I listed churches in Cumbria
Churches with elements of Anglo-Saxon work
English churches with Norman architecture
English Gothic architecture in Cumbria
Diocese of Carlisle
St Margaret and St James' Church